Vinícius Leite Silva (born 25 October 1993), known as Vinícius Leite, is a Brazilian footballer who plays as a forward for Avaí.

Club career
Born in Iporá, Goiás, Vinícius began his career with local side Umuarama, playing in the third division of the Campeonato Goiano. He moved to Grêmio Barueri in 2012, initially playing for the under-20 side before making his first team debut in the following year.

Vinícius joined Grêmio Osasco for the 2013 Copa Paulista, before subsequently representing Audax Rio, Portuguesa-RJ and Iporá. He impressed with the latter club, and signed a contract with Série B side Vila Nova on 12 April 2017.

On 18 December 2018, Vinícius agreed to a deal with Paysandu for the ensuing campaign. A regular starter, he left the club in November 2020 to join Avaí.

During the 2021 Série B, Vinícius was a regular starter as the club achieved promotion to the Série A.

Career statistics

Honours
Paysandu
Campeonato Paraense: 2020

Avaí
Campeonato Catarinense: 2021

References

External links

1993 births
Living people
Sportspeople from Goiás
Brazilian footballers
Association football forwards
Campeonato Brasileiro Série B players
Campeonato Brasileiro Série C players
Grêmio Barueri Futebol players
Grêmio Esportivo Osasco players
Audax Rio de Janeiro Esporte Clube players
Associação Atlética Portuguesa (RJ) players
Iporá Esporte Clube players
Vila Nova Futebol Clube players
Paysandu Sport Club players
Avaí FC players